Nicholas Payne Jones (born July 16, 1996) is an American former child actor. He is best known for voicing the title character in Chowder (2007-2010).

Early life
Jones was born on July 16, 1996 in Houston, Texas to Dallas Jones and Terri Yvonne Jones (née Cannon; 1963-2019). His mother was a news broadcaster and radio host. He moved to Los Angeles as a child.

Career
He is best known for voicing Chowder on the Cartoon Network series of the same name. He began his career in early 2006 at age 9, with the direct-to-video film, Disney's Bambi II as Flower. He also appeared during the live-action sequence in the Chowder episode "Shopping Spree". Early in his career, he starred in various commercials and movies, playing minor roles. He voiced Gumball in The Amazing World of Gumball pilot.

Filmography

Film

Television

Video games

Awards and nominations

References

External links

1996 births
Living people
21st-century American male actors
American male child actors
American male voice actors
Male actors from Houston
People from Texas